In classical rhetoric, the Common Topics were a short list of four traditional topics regarded as suitable to structure an argument.

Four Traditional Topics
Past Fact (Circumstance)
Possible/Impossible (Possibility)
Future Fact (Circumstance)
Greater/Lesser (Comparison)

Expanded List of Topics

Edward P.J. Corbett and Robert J. Connors expanded the list in their 1971 book Classical Rhetoric for the Modern Student to include:

Definition
genus / division / species
etymology
description
definition
example
synonyms
Comparison
similarity
difference
degree
Circumstance
cause and effect
timing
Relationship
contraries
exclusion
Testimony
statistics
maxims
law
precedents
personal example
historical example
authoritative quotes

See also
 Rhetoric (Aristotle)

References
 

Rhetoric